= Samsung SGH-A177 =

Mobile phone by Samsung

- Manufacturer: Samsung Electronics
- Availability by region: 2009
- Predecessor: A167
- Successor: A227
- Compatible networks: AT&T
- Form factor: Bar
- Dimensions: 4.29 inches tall X 2.32 inches wide
- Weight: 3.09 oz (88 g)
- Battery: Lithium-ion
- Rear camera: VGA
- Data inputs: QWERTY keypad

The Samsung SGH-A177 is a candy bar style mobile phone manufactured by Samsung.
